The Bangalore Principles of Judicial Conduct are standards for ethical conduct of judges.

The six core values are: 
 Independence
 Impartiality
 Integrity
 Propriety
 Equality
 Competence and Diligence

The Bangalore Code of Judicial Conduct was drafted in 2001 for the Judicial Group on Strengthening Judicial Integrity and presented to the Round Table Meeting of Chief Justices in November 2002.
Resolution 23 of the United Nations Social and Economic Council promotes implementation of the Bangalore Principles by the judiciaries of Member States.

See also
 Judicial independence
 Rule of law

References

External links
 Judicial Integrity Group
The Bangalore Principles of Judicial Conduct - Entire text
The Bangalore Principles of Judicial Conduct - Commentary

Judiciaries
Human rights
human rights law